"Come on Over" is a song by American recording artist Jessica Simpson from her sixth studio album, Do You Know. It was released on June 24, 2008 by Columbia Nashville as the lead single of the album. It was co-written by country music artist Rachel Proctor, Victoria Banks, and Simpson herself.

The song was moderately well received. In the United States, "Come on Over" became the most-added song to country radio for the week of June 6, 2008, debuting at number 41 on the Billboard Hot Country Songs chart. It broke a record held by Miranda Lambert ("Me and Charlie Talking") and Brad Cotter ("I Meant To") for highest-debuting first chart entry by a solo artist; both artists debuted at number 42 on that same chart. On July 12, 2008, the song peaked at number sixty-five on the Billboard Hot 100. However, the song was a success and peaked at 18th in Hot Country Songs.

The music video for "Come on Over", it was directed by Liz Friedlander and shot in Little Creek Ranch, California. The video begins with Simpson standing outside her house making a phone call to her love interest. She is then shown inside her house sitting next to the kitchen sink, looking out of the living room windows. In other shots, Simpson sings with a live backing band in a barn house, and sits on the back of a pick-up van. At the end of the video, she is shown sitting in a bathtub after a man is depicted leaving his car; his face is not shown. The song was nominated for a 2008 CMT fan-voted online award in the category of best "(What? I've Always Been Country) Crossover Artist".

Background and theme
After the release of her 2006 pop album A Public Affair, Simpson stated she wanted to go back to her roots and do country music because she "has been brought up around country music", and wants to give something back. Simpson had already sung country themed songs previous like "These Boots Are Made for Walkin'". "Come on Over" was co-written by country music artist Rachel Proctor, Victoria Banks and Simpson herself. The lyrics of the uptempo single focus on the narrator's paramour. Simpson said, "The fun thing about the song is that anxiety of wanting the guy to come over right then and there. Everybody's felt that before."

Music video
The music video for "Come on Over" was shot on June 19, 2008. It was directed by Liz Friedlander and shot in Little Creek Ranch, California. The video was premiered on Simpson's official website on July 11. 
It debuted on the CMT Top 20 countdown on August 1 at number 3 and peaked at number 2 the following week.
It reached number  on Yahoo!'s Top 100 Country Videos list on August 8. It also peaked at number 16 on GAC Top 20 Countdown.

The video begins with Simpson standing outside her house making a phone call to her love interest. She is then shown inside her house sitting next to the kitchen sink, looking out of the living room windows. In other shots, Simpson sings with a live backing band in a barn house, and sits on the back of a pick-up van. At the end of the video, she is shown sitting in a bathtub after a man is depicted leaving his car; his face is not shown. The video includes a close-up of the bottle for Simpson's fragrance, "Fancy", released in August 2008.

Critical reception
Billboard.com described the song as "Sexy and flirtatious" adding that "'Come On Over' is everything it needs to be—undeniably country and not forced. Under watchful maestro John Shanks and Brett James, Simpson shines on a steel guitar-laden track that finds her pleading with a beau to drop everything for a little loving." Rolling Stone said that "Surprisingly, her first twangy single is a slick treat", and that "Simpson keeps it simple and on a Shania Twain-esque foot-stomper built on energetic acoustic and slide guitars."

The song was nominated for a 2008 CMT fan-voted online award in the category of best "(What? I've Always Been Country) Crossover Artist", but lost to Darius Rucker's "Don't Think I Don't Think About It."

Chart performance
In the United States, "Come on Over" became the most-added song to country radio for the week of June 6, 2008, debuting at number 41 on the Billboard Hot Country Songs chart. It broke a record held by Miranda Lambert ("Me and Charlie Talking") and Brad Cotter ("I Meant To") for highest-debuting first chart entry by a solo artist; both artists debuted at number 42 on that same chart. Achievement entering reached Billboard Hot 100 at number sixty-five, becoming Simpson's first song to enter to this list since 2006. Also managed to position in Billboard Digital Songs at No. 41. As of July 2014, "Come on Over" has sold 470,000 paid digital downloads in the United States, according to Nielsen SoundScan. However, the song was a success and peaked at 18th in Hot Country Songs.

In Canada the song debuted at number eighty-eight, weeks later peaked at number sixty, due to the moderate digital sales. Internationally the song was released only in the UK.

Track listings

Digital download
"Come On Over " – 2:54

Charts

Release history

References

External links

2008 singles
2008 songs
Jessica Simpson songs
Music videos directed by Liz Friedlander
Song recordings produced by John Shanks
Songs written by Victoria Banks
Songs written by Rachel Proctor
Songs written by Jessica Simpson
Columbia Nashville Records singles
Song recordings produced by Brett James